Zobnatica is a village in northern Vojvodina. It is situated in the Bačka Topola municipality, itself a part of the North Bačka District. The village a population of 309 people of mostly Hungarians (according to the 2002 census). Zobnatica is also a known and successful horse stable, being the home for several winning horses that achieved success in Yugoslavia and, today, Serbia.

The Zobnatica stable

The tradition of horse breeding in the region has lasted continuously for hundreds of years, and Zobnatica has been a known horse breeding place for almost 500 years. The horse farm in Zobnatica was founded in 1779 by Bela Vojnic.

The Zobnatica stable encompasses a hippodrome, stables, a museum, a hotel and a restaurant. It has had a tradition of breeding thoroughbred horses for over two hundred years. The achievements of the Zobnatica horses are held in the museum, which is built in the shape of a horseshoe, and the former family hall now holds the hotel.

See also
List of places in Serbia
List of cities, towns and villages in Vojvodina
Zobnatica Lake

Places in Bačka